Mohamed Abdi Hashi (died 12 July 2020) was a Somali politician, who served as the president of USP during the 1990s. He hailed from the Dhulbahante clan, Qayaad sub clan.

He was the Vice President under Abdullahi Yusuf Ahmed from August 1998 to October 2004. He was the interim President of Puntland from October 2004 to 8 January 2005.

He died in the Kenyan capital of Nairobi on 12 July 2020. On 15 July he was buried in Garowe.

References

2020 deaths
Vice presidents of Puntland
Presidents of Puntland
Puntland politicians
Year of birth missing
Deaths from the COVID-19 pandemic in Kenya